Taqab (also Romanized as Taqāb and Tāghāb; also known as Moḩammadābād) is a village in Khusf Rural District of the Central District of Khusf County, South Khorasan province, Iran. At the 2006 National Census, its population was 920 in 256 households, when it was in the former Khusf District of Birjand County. The following census in 2011 counted 1,086 people in 336 households.

The latest census in 2016 showed a population of 967 people in 299 households, by which time the district had been separated from the county and Khusf County established with two new districts. It was the largest village in its rural district.

References 

Khusf County

Populated places in South Khorasan Province

Populated places in Khusf County